Gregory or Greg Smith may refer to:

Sportspeople

Baseball
Greg Smith (infielder) (born 1967), former infielder with the Chicago Cubs and Los Angeles Dodgers
Greg Smith (pitcher) (born 1983), pitcher for the Philadelphia Phillies

Basketball
Greg Smith (basketball, born 1947), former NBA player
Greg Smith (basketball, born 1991), American professional basketball player

Cricket
Greg Smith (cricketer, born 1971), Nottinghamshire cricketer
Greg Smith (cricketer, born 1983), Essex cricketer
Greg Smith (cricketer, born 1988), Nottinghamshire cricketer
Gregory Smith (cricketer), Caymanian cricketer

Rugby
Greg Smith (rugby union coach) (c. 1949–2002), Australian national rugby coach
Greg Smith (rugby league) (born 1973), Newcastle Knights rugby league player
Greg Smith (rugby union, born 1968), Fijian former rugby union player
Greg Smith (rugby union, born 1974), Fijian rugby union footballer

Other sports
Gregory Smith (canoeist) (born 1956), former Canadian sprint canoer
Greg Smith (ice hockey) (born 1955), former National Hockey League player, with the Washington Capitals
Greg Smith (American football, born 1959), former National Football League defensive lineman (1984)
Greg Smith (American football, born 1970), walk-on to the Ohio State football team in 1988
Greg Smith (Australian footballer) (born 1957), VFL and SANFL player
Gregory Smith (wrestler) (born 1986), American professional wrestler
Greg Smith (Paralympian) (born 1967), Australian Paralympian athlete and wheelchair rugby player
Greg Smith (curler) (born 1996), Canadian curler

Entertainers
Gregory Smith (actor) (born 1983), American-Canadian actor
Greg Smith (American musician) (born 1963), bassist and vocalist
Greg Smith (Canadian musician), Canadian musician

Politicians
Greg Smith (British politician) (born 1979), former deputy leader of Hammersmith & Fulham Council and Conservative MP for Buckingham constituency 
Greg Smith (Kansas politician) (born 1959), Republican member of the Kansas Senate
Greg Smith (Nevada politician) (born 1955), Democrat member of the Nevada Assembly
Greg Smith (New South Wales politician) (born 1947), Australian Liberal politician; New South Wales Legislative Assembly member for Epping and Attorney-General of New South Wales
Greg Smith (Oregon politician) (born 1968), American politician in the U.S. state of Oregon
Greg Smith (Western Australian politician) (born 1960), former Australian Liberal politician; member of the Western Australian Legislative Council for Mining and Pastoral
J. Gregory Smith (1818–1891), railroad tycoon, politician, war-time governor of Vermont

Other persons
Greg Smith (film producer) (1939–2009), British film producer of the 'Confessions' series 
Gregory Blake Smith (born 1951), American novelist and short story writer
Greg Smith, CFO of The Boeing Company
Greg "Tarzan" Smith, a contestant on Survivor: One World
Greg Smith (British Army officer) (born 1956), British businessman and Territorial Army officer
Gregory White Smith (1951–2014), American biographer
Greg Smith (artist) (born 1976), American artist
Greg Parma Smith (born 1983), New York-based painter

See also
Greg Smyth (1966–2018), Canadian ice hockey player